M3 Racing is a New Zealand motor racing team based in East Tāmaki, Auckland that competes in the V8SuperTourer series.

The team currently runs the #10 Skinny Mobile Holden for Richard Moore, the #15 Orix Holden for Morgan Haber, and the #1 Mike Pero Mortgages Holden for former V8 Supercar driver Greg Murphy.

History
A few years ago Murphy and Manuell began talking about creating a team to compete in New Zealand motorsport, agreeing a team effort would be the way to go. Richard's parents, Graeme and Karen Moore were also keen to see the team set up.

With the announcement that the V8SuperTourer would be debuting in 2012, the team was formed and premises built.

Brothers Kerry & Craig Holland along with Mike Squires provide facilities to the team.

M3 Racing is one of the most successful V8 SuperTourer Teams to date with the team picking up 11 Race Wins in just over a year of racing. The team also has 4 Round Wins and 2 Pole Positions, and also finished runner up in the Championship last year.

Racing record

(Bold indicates championships won.)

* Season still in progress.

References

External links

New Zealand auto racing teams
Auto racing teams established in 2012